Islam Dudaev (15 January 1995) is a Russian-born Albanian wrestler of Chechen origin.

Career 

In 2022, he won one of the bronze medals in the men's 65 kg event at the European Wrestling Championships held in Budapest, Hungary. He also won one of the bronze medals in the 74 kg event at the 2022 Mediterranean Games held in Oran, Algeria.

Major results

References

External links 
 

Living people
1995 births
Albanian male sport wrestlers
Russian male sport wrestlers
Mediterranean Games medalists in wrestling
Competitors at the 2022 Mediterranean Games
Islamic Solidarity Games competitors for Albania
21st-century Albanian people
20th-century Russian people
People from Khasavyurt